Jean-Marie Lassère (14 May 1932 – 17 June 2011) was a 20th-century French historian of the Roman world. He was professor of Roman history at the Paul Valéry University, Montpellier III. A specialist in Roman Africa, he was also an epigrapher, author of an important textbook.

Selected works 
 Manuel d’épigraphie romaine, Paris : Picard, Antiquité/Synthèses n°8, 2011, 2 vol., 576 et 608 p., 142 ill. (3rd edition reworked and expanded, 1st edit. in 2005).
 The chosen title indicates that the book is not only about the Latin inscriptions, but also the Greek inscriptions of the Roman world.
 Bibliographie analytique de l'Afrique antique, t. XX (1986) à XXIX (1995), E.F.R (in collaboration with Yann Le Bohec)
 Bibliographie analytique de l'Afrique antique, Index des fascicules I (1962-1963) à XXVII (1993), (in collaboration with Yann Le Bohec), E.F.R., 1998.
 Vbique Populus : peuplement et mouvements de population dans l'Afrique romaine, de la chute de Carthage à la fin de la dynastie des Sévères (146 aC-235 pC), Paris, 1977.

External links 
 Publications de Jean-Marie Lassère (Bibliographie du Maghreb antique et médiéval)
 « Ubique Populus ». Peuplement et mouvements de population dans l'Afrique romaine, de la chute de Carthage à la fin de la dynastie des Sévères on Persée
 Manuel d'épigraphie romaine. Tome 1 on Persée
 Main publications
 Biographical notice on the site of the Paul Valéry University, Montpellier III
 Hommage on https://encyclopedie berbère

20th-century French historians
French scholars of Roman history
French epigraphers
1932 births
2011 deaths
Deaths from cancer in France